Dharanidhar may refer to:

Dharanidhar Das, Indian politician
Dharanidhar Jena, Indian politician
Dharanidhar Naik, Indian tribal leader
Dharanidhar Sahu, Indian academic and writer
Dharanidhar Autonomous College, in Keonjhar, Odisha

Indian masculine given names